Serafima Ilyinichna Hopner (1880–1966) was a Bolshevik politician, a Hero of Socialist Labor (1960), and a Doctor of Historical Sciences (1934).

Beginning in 1903, she was a member, and then a secretary of the Bolshevik party in Yekaterinoslav. In 1910-1917, she lived in emigration.  From September 9 to October 23, 1918, she was the secretary of the Communist Party (Bolshevik) of Ukraine. In 1928-1938 she worked for the Comintern. Beginning in 1945, she was an employee of the Institute of Marxism-Leninism in Moscow.

References

1880 births
1966 deaths
Politicians from Kherson
People from Kherson Governorate
Jews from the Russian Empire
Old Bolsheviks
Jewish Soviet politicians 
First Secretaries of the Communist Party of Ukraine (Soviet Union)
Soviet women in politics
20th-century Ukrainian women politicians
Heroes of Socialist Labour
Recipients of the Order of Lenin
University of Paris alumni
Russian expatriates in France
Soviet Marxist historians